Theresa Dostaler is a Canadian hockey mom, hockey activist and entrepreneur, best known for founding canadianhockeymoms.ca in 2010.

References 

Living people
Canadian activists
Year of birth missing (living people)